Psaeropterella is a genus of picture-winged flies in the family Ulidiidae.

Species
 P. macrocephala
 P. punctifrons

References

Ulidiidae